Cliq may refer to:

Cliq (duo), known for their 2017 song "Wavey"
Motorola Cliq, a mobile phone
Tata Cliq, an e-commerce company

See also
Clique (disambiguation)
The Kliq, a group of professional wrestlers